Mita Teriipaia is the French Polynesian minister for culture and the arts. He was appointed to his post in the government by President Gaston Tong Sang in November 2009.

Teriipaia is affiliated with the To Tatou Ai’a ("Our Home") group of anti-independence Polynesian political parties, and represents the Windward Islands electoral circumscription.

References

Year of birth missing (living people)
Living people
Government ministers of French Polynesia
O Porinetia To Tatou Ai'a politicians